Rakwa Tso, also known as Rawu Tso or Ranwu Lake, is a lake in Baxoi County, Chamdo Prefecture, Tibet Autonomous Region, China, to the north of Arza Gongla Glacier, and to the south of Ngagung Tso. The lake was created by a landslide dam. Parlung River flows out of the lake.

The lake is within the historical region of Kham. It has been a famous tourist destination.

Lakes of Tibet